The 2019 MAC women's basketball tournament was the postseason basketball tournament that ended the 2018–19 college basketball season in the Mid-American Conference. Tournament first-round games were held on campus sites at the higher seed on March 11. The remaining rounds were held at Quicken Loans Arena, now known as Rocket Mortgage FieldHouse, in Cleveland, Ohio between March 13 and 16. The MAC Women's Tournament champion received the conference's automatic bid into the 2019 NCAA tournament. Buffalo won the conference tournament championship game 77–61 over Ohio. Cierra Dillard was named the tournament's Most Valuable Player.

Format
Unlike recent MAC women's tournaments, in which the top two seeds received byes into the semifinals, with the 3 and 4 seeds receiving a bye to the quarterfinals, the tournament reverted to its original structure in which the top four seeds receive just one bye into the quarterfinals.

Seeds

Schedule

Bracket
Miami (OH), Ohio, Buffalo and Central Michigan have clinched first round byes
Miami (OH), Ohio, Buffalo and Central Michigan have clinched home games in the second round
Akron, Bowling Green, Eastern Michigan, Western Michigan and Ball State will play in the first round

First round games at campus sites of lower-numbered seeds

All-Tournament team
Tournament MVP – Cierra Dillard, Buffalo

See also
2019 MAC men's basketball tournament

References

External links

Mid-American Conference women's basketball tournament
2018–19 Mid-American Conference women's basketball season
MAC women's basketball tournament
Basketball competitions in Cleveland
College basketball tournaments in Ohio
Women's sports in Ohio
2010s in Cleveland